Jean-Claude Hollerich, S.J. (born 9 August 1958) is a Luxembourger prelate of the Catholic Church, who has served as the Archbishop of Luxembourg since 2011. He has been the president of the Commission of the Bishops' Conferences of the European Union (COMECE) since March 2018.

In addition to studies and pastoral work in Belgium, Germany, and Luxembourg, he studied in Japan from 1985 to 1989 and worked there from 1994 to 2011.

Pope Francis raised him to the rank of cardinal on 5 October 2019, He is the first cardinal from Luxembourg.

Biography 
Hollerich was born on 9 August 1958 in Differdange. He grew up in Vianden and attended the École Apostolique of Clairefontaine in Eischen and the Lycée Classique in Diekirch. From 1978 to 1981 he studied Catholic Theology and Philosophy at the Pontifical Gregorian University in Rome. On 27 September 1981 he joined the Jesuits.  After a novitiate in Namur from 1981 to 1983, he did pastoral work from 1983 to 1985 in Luxembourg. From 1985 to 1989, Hollerich studied Japanese language and culture as well as theology at Sophia University in Tokyo. He earned a theological licentiate in 1990 from the Sankt Georgen Graduate School of Philosophy and Theology in Frankfurt am Main.

On 21 April 1990 he was ordained a priest in Brussels. From 1990 to 1994 he earned a licentiate in German language and literature at the Ludwig Maximilian University of Munich. Until 2001 he was a doctoral student at the Centre for European Integration Studies in Bonn. On 18 October 2002, Hollerich took his perpetual vows in St. Ignatius' church in Tokyo. He is a member of the Japanese Jesuit province and was a professor of German, French and European studies (1994-2011) and Vice-Rector for General and Student Affairs of the Sophia University in Tokyo.

Pope Benedict XVI appointed Hollerich Archbishop of Luxembourg on 12 July 2011. He received his episcopal consecration on 16 October 2011 in the cathedral in Luxembourg from his predecessor Fernand Franck; the co-consecrators were the Archbishop of Cologne, Joachim Cardinal Meisner and the Archbishop of Tokyo, Peter Takeo Okada. He is the eighth Bishop and third Archbishop of Luxembourg.

Hollerich presided at the wedding of Guillaume, Hereditary Grand Duke of Luxembourg and Countess Stéphanie de Lannoy at Luxembourg's Notre-Dame Cathedral on 20 October 2012.

He has held leadership positions in a number of European associations. He was President of the Conference of European Justice and Peace Commissions from 2014 to 2018 and became President of the Council of Bishops' Conferences of Europe's Commission for Youth in September 2017. In March 2018, he was elected to a five-year term as president of the Commission of the Bishops' Conferences of the European Union (COMECE). Pope Francis appointed him to participate in the 2018 Synod of Bishops on Youth, Faith, and vocational discernment.

Since 1994, Hollerich has been a member of the Catholic student fraternity, AV Edo-Rhenania zu Tokio and of AV Rheinstein zu Köln im CV.

On 5 October 2019, Pope Francis made him Cardinal-Priest of San Giovanni Crisostomo a Monte Sacro Alto. Interviewed shortly afterwards, he supported the ordination of married men to the Catholic priesthood. He said: "I love my celibacy, I stand by it, but I see that married deacons can preach differently than I do, and I find that in itself a wonderful addition."

He was made a member of the Pontifical Council for Culture on 21 February 2020 and member of the Pontifical Council for Interreligious Dialogue on 8 July 2020.

In September 2020, he suggested that the limitations placed by the COVID-19 pandemic on access to the sacraments and church instruction programs will result in a smaller Church, because those who attend for cultural reasons will have learned to live without the Church. He thought this only exacerbated current trends, because "this merely cultural Catholicism, cannot last over time". He also said he supported asking the "big questions" but hoped the anticipated German synod would recognize its obligations to the Church worldwide. He thought the most important question was the role of women in the Church and expressed a willingness to consider the ordination of women: "I just don't know. But I am open to it. It is clear, however, that the current situation is not enough. You have to see and notice that women have a say in the church."

On 8 July 2021, Pope Francis appointed him relator general of the next synod of bishops.

In 2022, Hollerich said he considered the church's teaching  that homosexual relationships are sinful to be wrong: "I believe that the sociological-scientific foundation of this teaching is no longer correct."

On 7 March 2023, Hollerich was appointed to the Council of Cardinal Advisors.

See also
Cardinals created by Francis
Jesuit cardinal

References 

Further reading

External links

 

1958 births
Living people
21st-century Roman Catholic archbishops in Luxembourg
Luxembourgian expatriates in Japan
Luxembourgian expatriates in Belgium
Luxembourgian expatriates in Germany
Luxembourgian Jesuits
Luxembourgian cardinals
People from Differdange
Academic staff of Sophia University
Sankt Georgen Graduate School of Philosophy and Theology alumni
Jesuit archbishops
Jesuit cardinals
Cardinals created by Pope Francis